Alister Irvine Paterson (born 14 March 1959) is a former Australian politician. He was the Liberal member for South Barwon in the Victorian Legislative Assembly from 1992 to 2002.

Paterson was born in Melbourne to John Austin Paterson and Marjorie Webber Ball. He was educated at Scotch College, and subsequently became a journalist, although he also worked as a sales and programming executive.

He was a founding member of the Melbourne branch of the Liberal Party in 1982, and worked for party media training from 1982 to 1991. From 1987 to 1989 he was senior newsreader on ATV10, and a radio host and commentator on 3AW from 1988 to 1990. From 1991 to 1992 he was a self-employed media consultant.

He is currently the Chief of Staff to Victorian Liberal Senator, Sarah Henderson.

In 1992, Paterson was selected to contest the state seat of South Barwon against Liberal-turned-Independent MP Harley Dickinson. Paterson defeated Dickinson to win the seat. He sat as a backbencher from his election until his defeat in 2002.

References

1959 births
Living people
Liberal Party of Australia members of the Parliament of Victoria
Members of the Victorian Legislative Assembly
21st-century Australian politicians